Ace, Jack & King  is the fifth album by Virginia-based blues rock artist, Eli Cook. It was released in 2011.

The album contains a combination of Cook's acoustic blues and folk stylings with his electric hard rock touch. Vintage Guitar Magazine said of the album's sound, "A throaty vocal matches the crunchy guitars that lean as much toward metal as they do blues.“

Personnel
Eli Cook- Vocals, Guitars, Mandolin
Brian "Boogie" Thomas- Bass
Wade Warfield- Drums, Percussion
Wavorly Milor- Harmonica

Track listing
All songs written by Eli Cook, except where noted.

External links
Death Rattle (slight return)
Crow Jane

References

2011 albums
Blues rock albums by American artists